Animal Dreams is a 1990 novel by Barbara Kingsolver. A woman named Cosima "Codi" Noline returns to her hometown of Grace, Arizona to help her aging father, who is slowly losing his struggle with Alzheimer's disease. She takes a biology teacher position at the local high school and lives with her old high school friend, Emelina. Animal Dreams features Kingsolver's trademark—alternating perspectives throughout the novel. Most chapters are told from the perspective of Codi, while others are told from her father, Homer's, perspective. The book was dedicated to Ben Linder, who was killed by the Contras on April 28, 1987.

The novel features some Hispanic and Native American themes.  Codi's sister, Halimeda "Hallie", moves to Nicaragua to teach local people more sustainable farming techniques and dies after being captured by the Contras. Another political theme in the novel is the small town's fight against the Black Mountain Mining Company, which pollutes the river water and nearly destroys the citizens' orchard trees, Grace's primary economic livelihood.

In addition to political themes like these, many of Kingsolver's novels also feature images and themes from biology. Animal Dreams is rich with natural imagery and the study of the created world. And, as with most Kingsolver novels, this one is laced with genial humor.

Plot summary
Animal Dreams opens with a chapter narrated in the third person from the point of view of Doc Homer. This establishes a double narrative voice, which switches between dreams and memories of the past and events of the present. Doc Homer remembers his daughters, Codi and Hallie, when they were young. Their mother is dead. In the second chapter, narrated by Codi in first person, the plot line begins. Hallie leaves Tucson, Arizona, where she was living with Codi and Carlo, for Nicaragua. She plans to assist the newly established communist regime with their crop cultivation. Shortly thereafter, Codi also leaves Tucson, returning to her small rural hometown, Grace, to care for her ailing father and to teach high school biology. The return to Grace is fraught with difficulty for Codi, as she has always felt herself an outsider in the town and has never had a very close relationship with her father. Her return home raises the specter of several mysteries surrounding Codi and her family's past: her failure to hold a medical license despite her attendance at medical school, the deaths of her mother and of her child, and the relationship of her family to the rest of the community.

In Grace, Codi stays in her friend Emelina Domingos's guest house. As the two women talk, Codi's high school relationship with Loyd Peregrina is revealed. Loyd, a friend of Emelina's husband J.T., still lives and works in town. Re-visiting Grace, Codi is again struck by her feeling of being an outsider. Codi and Hallie's mother died shortly after Hallie's birth. At the age of fifteen, Codi became pregnant with and then miscarried Loyd's child. She never told anyone. Her father, the town doctor, was aware of the situation, but Codi still does not know this.

Codi and Loyd meet again and begin a new relationship. Loyd, a Native American who grew up on the nearby Reservation, is ready to establish a serious and committed relationship, but Codi is not ready to imagine herself as staying in one place or loving only one person. Loyd accepts her ambivalence. They continue to see each other, and he teaches her about Native American Cultures.

Reception
Writing in the New York Times Jane Smiley has some reservations about the novel "Ms. Kingsolver has chosen to explore Codi's despair, and in doing so she frequently undermines the suspense and the weight of her book. First-person narration can be tricky, and Ms. Kingsolver falls into its trap: Codi comes across too often as a whiner, observant of others but invariably more concerned with her own state of mind." Smiley concludes that Kingsolver "demonstrates a special gift for the vivid evocation of landscape and of her characters' state of mind. That she leaves open spaces, that she doesn't quite integrate everything into a perfect system, is probably to her credit."

Kirkus Reviews says "Kingsolver has political conviction, a wonderful eye for the surface of things and many charming poetic conceits,
but here her characters seem constructed rather than real. A promising miss."

Margaret Randall of the Los Angeles Times is positive "As I read the last few pages of Animal Dreams, I felt a brief moment of panic. Would this book really end as it seemed it was going to? Suddenly the outcome I had hoped for unwound before my grateful eyes. Things happened as I wanted them to, as I breathed a sigh of relief. This neat wrap-up may be the single flaw in an otherwise exceptionally crafted narrative. Most important for me, however, is my conviction that Kingsolver is giving a new voice to our literature, one that fulfills its promise even as it begins its journey: four books in as many years."

Awards
Pen/USA West Fiction Award
Edward Abbey Award for Ecofiction
Named an American Library Association Notable Book, the Arizona Library Association Book of the Year, and a New York Times Notable Book.

References

External links

 Animal Dreams on Barbara Kingsolver's website 
 Animal Dreams book

1990 American novels
Novels by Barbara Kingsolver
Novels set in Arizona
HarperCollins books
Books about Alzheimer's disease